Semyon Danilovich Nomokonov (12 August 1900 – 15 July 1973) was a Soviet sniper during World War II credited with 367 kills. An ethnic Hamnigan Evenk, Nomokonov was among the indigenous peoples of Russia who fought in the war. He received the nickname "Taiga Shaman" from enemies.

Early life
Nomokonov was born in the settlement of Delyun in Zabaykalsky Krai, Russia (then Russian Empire), to a poor family of hunters, and from childhood lived in the Taiga. Nomokonov first used a rifle at the age of 7. He hunted Sable, Manchurian wapiti and Elk, and was nicknamed Eye of the Kite. Nomokonov was baptized at the age of 15 and received the name Semyon. In 1928 Nomokonov moved to the settlement of Nizhny Stan in the Russian Shilkinsky District. He continued hunting and also practiced carpentry.

War
Nomokonov started his military service in August 1941, initially in a subsistence farm of a regiment. Then he made crutches for the wounded. Nomokonov became a sniper by chance. In the fall of 1941 he was evacuating one of the wounded, when he noticed a German, aiming at him. Nomokonov killed him with his own rifle. According to another version, in October 1941 Nomokonov received a rifle and decided to test it. To avoid wasting the rounds, Nomokonov tested the rifle on a German, who was moving along the wooded lake shore, bending down. After that Nomokonov was transferred to a sniper platoon. He started to shoot from a Mosin–Nagant rifle without a telescopic sight. Nomokonov fought at the Valdai Heights, Karelian Isthmus, Ukraine, Lithuania, East Prussia and then in Manchuria. He initially marked the number of kills on his smoking pipe. Nomokonov was wounded eight times and suffered a blast injury twice.

As a sniper instructor, Nomokonov trained over 150 soldiers.

After the war
Nomokonov returned home on a horse. He continued practicing carpentry in Nizhny Stan, but then moved to the settlement of Zugalay, where his elder sons were living. He built a house and continued hunting during free time. In the fall of 1945 Nomokonov received a horse, binoculars and a rifle no. 24638 for his military service. According to Nomokonov's daughter Zoya Babuyeva, he was a taciturn person and did not like to talk much about the war.

Nomokonov died in Zugalay and was interred there. Poet Vasily Lebedev-Kumach dedicated a poem to him.

Nomokonov left nine children and 49 grandchildren.

Awards 

 Order of Lenin
 Order of the Red Banner
 Two Order of the Red Star
 Medal "For Battle Merit"
 campaign and jubilee medals

Notes

References

1900 births
1973 deaths
People from Zabaykalsky Krai
Evenks
Soviet military snipers
Soviet military personnel of World War II
Recipients of the Order of Lenin
Recipients of the Order of the Red Banner